Grove Ferry and Upstreet was a railway station in east Kent. It was opened by South Eastern Railway (SER), on the Ashford to Ramsgate (via Canterbury West) line between Sturry station and Minster station.

History
Grove Ferry station opened on 13 April 1846, the rural station was built to serve the village of Upstreet and the ferry crossing of the Great Stour until 1966, when a bridge was built. The nearby "Grove Ferry Inn" owned the rights to the ferry and farmed  of lavender,  creating a popular day trip destination up until the Second World War; this is now part of the Grove Ferry Picnic Area. The public level crossing and goods sidings leading to the ferry were operated from a small signal box.

The station was renamed Grove Ferry & Upstreet in September 1954. A concrete footbridge was built at the station in preparation for this change. The signal box closed on 14 March 1964, and the level crossing was converted to automatic half barriers on 3 January 1966. The station closed the same day, shortly before the introduction of a bus service over the new Grove Ferry Bridge, which would have undermined the low patronage.

Remains today
The station buildings and up platform have been demolished and only a few traces remain of the down platform. The broad steps leading to the footpath connecting the station to the village, although overgrown, can still be seen.
Grove Ferry and Upstreet Station lives on in model form due to the efforts of the Ashford Model Railway Club, with the model occasionally being taken on tour.

References 
Citations

Sources
 

Disused railway stations in Kent
Former South Eastern Railway (UK) stations
Railway stations in Great Britain opened in 1846
Railway stations in Great Britain closed in 1966
1846 establishments in England
1966 disestablishments in England